Blue Marble Geographics is a developer and provider of geographic information system software products focused on data translation. They provide software products and services for working with GIS data in different formats.

Blue Marble is a member of the Open Geospatial Consortium.

Products

Geographic Calculator 
Blue Marble's first software product, the Geographic Calculator, was developed in 1992 and released in 1993. The Geographic Calculator is a coordinate conversion library with a database of coordinate mathematical objects including projections, coordinate systems, datums, ellipsoids, linear and angular units. The tool is primarily used to translate map coordinates from one system to another. In 2004, the underlying GeoCalc library was re-written and in 2007 a new version was released as the Blue Marble Desktop.

2013 saw a rebranding of the Blue Marble Desktop back to the Geographic Calculator. Blue Marble incorporated all of the functionality of the Blue Marble Desktop including the Geographic Transformer, Translator and Spatial Connect products into the new Geographic Calculator. This did away with the confusing versioning and introduced an easier-to-follow annual naming convention with one or two service pack updates between releases.

Global Mapper 
Global Mapper is a geographic information system software package currently developed by Blue Marble Geographics that runs on Microsoft Windows. Global Mapper handles both vector, raster, and elevation data, and provides viewing, conversion, and other general GIS features.

In 1995 the USGS was in need of a Windows viewer for their data products, so they developed the dlgv32 application for viewing their DLG (Digital Line Graph) vector data products. Between 1995 and 1998 the dlgv32 application was expanded to include support for viewing other USGS data products, including DRG (topographic maps) and DEM (digital elevation model) and SDTS-DLG and SDTS-DEM data products. The development process is described in detail in the USGS paper titled 'A Programming Exercise'.

In 1998 the USGS released the source code for dlgv32 v3.7 to the public domain. 

In 2001, the source code for dlgv32 was further developed by a private individual into the commercial product dlgv32 Pro v4.0 and offered for sale via the internet. Later that same year the product was renamed to Global Mapper and become a commercial product of the company Global Mapper Software LLC. The USGS was distributing a version of the software under the name dlgv32 Pro (Global Mapper).

Blue Marble acquired Global Mapper, LLC  at the end of 2011. Mike Childs, the original developer of Global Mapper, continues to work for Blue Marble as a lead developer.

In 2013, Blue Marble released a major version update to Global Mapper that also introduced the new Global Mapper LiDAR Module. The Global Mapper LiDAR Module offers optional enhancement to base Global Mapper application and provides numerous advanced LiDAR processing tools (e.g., automatic point cloud classification, automatic extraction of buildings, trees, and powerlines, cross-sectional viewing and point editing, custom digitizing or extraction of 3D line and area features, etc.).

Company history
Blue Marble Geographics was established in 1993 and was originally located in Gardiner, Maine. The company founder, Jeffrey Bennett Cole, retired in 2003 and Patrick Cunningham took over as President, adding employees and re-focusing the product offering over the next few years. In 2008, they received the Governor’s Award for technology company of the year at the TechMaine technology awards showcase.  Blue Marble is one of a handful of geospatial or GIS software companies to come out of Maine in the nineties. The company's founder studied at the University of Maine and like other well known GIS companies from Maine, its roots are tied to the surveying and forestry programs of the University of Maine. After years of growing, the company has moved its home office to Hallowell, Maine.

See also
 The Blue Marble NASA photograph from Apollo 17

References

External links
 

1993 establishments in Maine
Companies based in Kennebec County, Maine
Companies established in 1993
Earth sciences data formats
Hallowell, Maine
GIS software companies
Software companies based in Maine
Software companies of the United States